Levon Julfalakyan (born 5 April 1964) is a former Soviet Armenian Greco-Roman wrestler. He is an Olympic, World, and European Champion and was merited Honoured Master of Sports of the USSR in 1988. Julfalakyan is the current head coach of the Armenian national Greco-Roman wrestling team and President of the Union of Armenian Olympians, as well as a member of the executive committee of the NOC.

Early life
Levon Julfalakyan was born in Leninakan, Armenian SSR (now Gyumri, Armenia). Coming from an athletic background, both of his parents had been gymnasts. Levon attended gymnastics sections from an early age, then started wrestling in Gyumri Youth Academy. In 1983, he won the junior championship of the USSR. He graduated from Gyumri State Pedagogical Institute (now Shirak State University).

Career
Julfalakyan joined the Soviet national wrestling team in 1985 and, in that same year, won a gold medal at the Wrestling World Cup team competition. Julfalakyan later became a European Champion when he won a gold medal at the 1986 European Wrestling Championships. Four months later, Julfalakyan also became a World Champion by winning a gold medal at the 1986 World Wrestling Championships.

At the 1988 Summer Olympics in Seoul, Julfalakyan competed in the weight category of 68 kg. Julfalakyan was very dominant in all of his matches and defeated every opponent by a wide margin of points. Julfalakyan was awarded an Olympic gold medal for his victory.

A year prior to becoming an Olympic Champion, Julfalakyan came in third place at the 1989 World Wrestling Championships. He decided to retire from wrestling afterward.

After retiring from competitions Julfalakyan worked as a wrestling coach. In 1999 he became the head coach of the Armenian national Greco-Roman wrestling team and president of the Union of Armenian Olympians. In 2002 he was appointed as vice-president of the Armenian Wrestling Federation, and next year became a member of the executive committee of the NOC. Julfalakyan was also President of the Armenian Olympians Association.

Personal life
Julfalakyan currently lives in Yerevan. He is married and has two sons Arsen and Aram, who are also wrestlers. His elder son Arsen Julfalakyan won an Olympic silver medal at the 2012 Summer Olympics in London for Armenia and carried the national flag at the closing ceremony.

Awards
Julfalakyan was awarded the "For Merit" 1st degree medal in 2012.

References

External links
The-Sports.org
Interview

1964 births
Living people
Sportspeople from Gyumri
Shirak State University alumni
Soviet male sport wrestlers
Armenian male sport wrestlers
Recipients of the Order of Friendship of Peoples
Honoured Masters of Sport of the USSR
Olympic wrestlers of the Soviet Union
Wrestlers at the 1988 Summer Olympics
Olympic gold medalists for the Soviet Union
Olympic medalists in wrestling
Medalists at the 1988 Summer Olympics
World Wrestling Championships medalists
Armenian wrestling coaches
National team coaches
Soviet Armenians
Armenian sports executives and administrators
European Wrestling Championships medalists
Ethnic Armenian sportspeople